The Autonomous University of Madrid (UAM), commonly known as simply la Autónoma, is a Spanish public university located in Madrid, Spain. The university was founded in 1968 alongside the Autonomous University of Barcelona, in Barcelona. UAM is widely respected as one of the most prestigious universities in Europe. According to the highly regarded QS World University Rankings 2022, UAM is ranked as the top university in Spain.

Founded in 1968, its main campus, Cantoblanco, is located near the cities of Alcobendas, San Sebastián de los Reyes and Tres Cantos. UAM's Cantoblanco Campus holds most of the university's facilities. UAM offers 94 doctorate programs in all of the universities studies. It also offers 88 master's degrees.
According to a study carried out by the newspaper El Mundo, in 2021, UAM was the best university in the country to study Biology, Nursing, Medicine, Physics and Law, within the 50 careers with the highest demand.

History 
The Stabilization Plan of 1959 and the development plans of the 1960s boosted the Spanish economy after years of austerity and the self-sufficiency-based economy. The end of diplomatic and economic isolation led to an economic boom in Spain that resulted in the consolidation of a middle class similar to that of other Western European nations. The demand of higher education increased, and the Spanish university system grew increasingly congested.

The Autonomous University of Madrid was established by the 5-1968 Decree approved by the Spanish Council of Ministers during the Francoist dictatorship along with the Autonomous University of Barcelona and the University of Bilbao. This decree was sponsored by the then-Minister of Science and Education, José Luis Villar Palasí, in order to restructure the Spanish university system. The name Universidad Autónoma de Madrid first appeared in an executive order by the Ministry which was published on 13 August 1968.

On 8 June 2018 the Autonomous University of Madrid celebrated its 50th Anniversary with a series of commemorative events, starting with a debate on university autonomy (after the scandal of the former president of the Community of Madrid, Cristina Cifuentes and her master's degree in the University Juan Carlos I). In the debate, called "Past, present and future (1968–2018)", the rector of the UAM Rafael Garesse, and the rectors of the Autonomous University of Barcelona, Margarita Arboix, and the Basque Country, Nekane Balluerka participated.

Campuses

Main campus

UAM's Cantoblanco Campus holds most of the university's facilities. It is located 15 km north of Madrid and has an extension of over 2,200,000 m2. Of these are nearly 770,000 urbanised and about a third of them garden areas. The campus was designed as a university town that was to be self-sufficient, but also would be away from Madrid in order to keep student activity against the Francoist dictatorship away from the capital.

Initially, the campus held the faculties of philosophy and liberal arts, law, economics, business management, and science, as well as the rectorate, several other service buildings and sports facilities. The university's other facilities, the faculty of medicine and the teacher training Santa Maria school are in downtown Madrid. There are two other teacher training schools in Segovia and in Cuenca. Over the years, the faculty of psychology, the biology building of the faculty of sciences, the new faculty of law (that allowed the transfer of the teacher training school to the main campus, and that was later transformed in faculty of education and teacher training) along with its political science annex building, the polytechnic school (initially superior technical school of computing engineers), the libraries of humanities and sciences, as well as the Erasmus of Rotterdam dormitory have been built on the main campus.

The original faculties were housed in interconnected buildings with several patios in between them. Characteristic of each building is a large number of stairs in its corridors, initially designed to prevent students from running in case of police raids. Currently, this fact has been considered by many university officials as a setback in the integration of handicapped students. The newest facilities were built in a contemporary style, being more accessible and allowing more free movement to students. Sporting facilities include two swimming pools (an indoor one and an outdoor one), two multiple-use pavilions, and outdoor tennis, football, basketball, paddle tennis, rugby, and futsal and beach volleyball courts.

Other services on campus include 16 cafeterias and other eating facilities, medical services, a pharmacy with optic care, a foreign languages pavilion, and a bookstore. The campus also houses several research facilities partnered with the Spanish Scientific Research Council (CSIC). Cantoblanco Campus is accessible by train belonging to Renfe Cercanias Commuter service (station Cantoblanco-Universidad), or by the Madrid Region Commuter Bus service. The campus is located in the B1 area of the Madrid Transports Consortium.

Medicine Campus
UAM faculty of medicine is located north of Madrid near La Paz teaching hospital (that acts as one of the faculty's teaching hospitals, as Puerta de Hierro Majadahonda Hospital, La Princesa Hospital, Niño Jesús Hospital and Fundación Jiménez Díaz do). It was inaugurated in 1969. Juan Luis Vives Residence Hall was UAM's first residential facility. It is located in the Plaza Castilla area in northern Madrid. It has 130 residents and holds several cultural activities of the university.

La Cristalera
La Cristalera residence is located in Miraflores de la Sierra, a village north of Madrid that was acquired by the university in 1989. It is used for conferences and meetings and is the main centre of UAM's summer courses.

Academic organization

The UAM is divided into eight faculties and superior schools that support and coordinate most of the university's academic and administrative activity. Each faculty is divided into departments that coordinate the teaching and research of the different subjects. Researchers can organise into research institutes in order to coordinate their activities in a specific research field. The university totals up to 59 departments and eight research institutes. In addition to these, the UAM has seven associate schools, which are not completely part of UAM's administrative structure, but issue UAM-recognised titles and are under UAM's academic regulations.

Faculties and superior schools:
 Faculty of Philosophy and Liberal Arts
 Faculty of Law
 Faculty of Economic Science and Business Management
 Faculty of Sciences
 Faculty of Medicine
 Faculty of Psychology
 Engineering School (until 2002 Superior School of Computer Engineers)
 Faculty of Teacher Training and Education (until 2002 Santa Maria School of Teacher Training)

Associate schools are:
 Red Cross School of Nursing
 Puerta de Hierro School of Nursing
 Jimenez Diaz Foundation School of Nursing
 ONCE School of physiotherapy
 LaSalle Institute of Higher Education
 Escuela de Gemología

Administrative organisation

UAM administration is established according to the 2001's Organic Law of Universities (LOU). The Senior Academic and Administrative Officer of the Autonomous University of Madrid is the rector, who must be, by law, a chair professor serving in the university, elected every four years with a two-term limit by universal graded suffrage. The current rector is José Maria Sanz, chair of applied physics, who substituted his predecessor Angel Gabilondo in 2009, when Gabilondo became Minister of Education. An indefinite number of vice-rectors are appointed by the rector to lead different administrative departments of the university (such as Student affairs or Graduate academic affairs), and a secretary general coordinating the rector's team and overseeing the legal procedures of the university, as well as university protocol. The rector, in accordance with the university's social board, also designates the manager as part of his team, which oversees the university's economic and administrative activity.

The grades assigned to each sector for rectoral elections in UAM according to its charter are:
 Full professors: 51% of the final votes
 Students: 28% of the final votes
 Other professors: 9%
 Non-teaching personnel: 9%
 Teaching and research personnel in training: 3%.

UAM's collective government bodies are the University Assembly, The Board of Governors, and The Social Board. The University Assembly is made out of 153 full professors, 84 students, 27 hired, associate, or emeritus professors, 27 members of the non-teaching personnel, 9 research or teaching trainees, the rector, the secretary-general, and the manager. It is the highest representative body of the university. It elaborates the university's general guidelines, changes or passes a new university charter, elects twenty members of the Board of Governors, and elects the university Ombudsman.

The Board of Governors is the ordinary governmental body of the university. It controls and passes regulations on most of the university's academic, personnel, and administrative issues. It is composed of the rector, the secretary-general, the manager, 20 members elected by the assembly according to its composition, all the deans and the head of the polytechnic school, 7 heads of department, a head of research institute, 15 members designated by the rector and three members of the Social Board.

The Social Board is the body responsible for the relations between university and society. Its members are designated by trade unions, the municipality of Madrid, employers unions, companies related to the university, the Madrid Assembly and the Board of Governors of the university. It also oversees the universities financial activities and passes the university budget. Its current chairman is Manuel Pizarro.

Faculties are headed by a dean, whilst the responsible of the polytechnic school is called head. They are elected in the same way as the rector and have also a limit of two four-year terms. They are aided by vice-deans or deputy heads. They are overseen by a faculty or school board. Departments are led by the head of department and overseen by the department council.

Studies

Undergraduate
UAM offers Spanish undergraduates fully recognized degrees. There are the Diplomatura and Ingenierías Técnicas (technical engineering), which are three-year studies equivalent to an associate degree. Licenciaturas and Ingenierías Superiores are four to five years studies equivalent to a bachelor's degree. Along with that, UAM offers second level licenciaturas, which allow people who have a diplomatura to obtain a licenciatura by taking courses. In other case, they must have at least the first two or three years of a licenciatura and combined degree, which are very popular among Spanish students. They also offer courses in languages other than Spanish.

In addition to the Faculties where the degrees on the different fields of knowledge and science are studied —Faculty of Science, F. of Business and Economic Science, F. of Law, F. of Philosophy and the Arts, F. of Teacher Training and Education, F. of Psychology, F. of Medicine and School of Engineering— there are external centers that teach specific studies and their associated degree: "La Salle" Centre of Higher Education, The Red Cross School of Nursing, The Jimenez Diaz Foundation University School of Nursing, The ONCE University School of Physioterapy.

Graduate
UAM offers 94 PhD programs in all of the universities programs. It also offers 72 master's degrees, and with the implementation of the Bologna Process 16 recognised master's degrees for the academic year of 2006–07.

Research 
In addition, the alliance of the four leading Spanish public Universities, two in Madrid (Autónoma University of Madrid and Universidad Carlos III) and two in Barcelona (Universitat Autònoma de Barcelona, Universitat Pompeu Fabra) allows close collaboration between projects and researchers.

Reputation 

Throughout its history, the UAM has been one of Spain's most prominent higher education institutions, being ranked second amongst Spanish universities by the El Mundo University Supplement (known as "Las 50 Carreras") (after the Universitat Autònoma de Barcelona). For the subject "Mathematics" the university was ranked within top 51-75 universities in the world (within top 12 in Europe). It was the Spanish university with the most researchers among the most cited according to the Thomson Reuters ranking citation in 2011.

Student life

Societies and compromise
The Autonomous University of Madrid has an active student body, having organised one of Spain's most important events against the dictatorship in 1976 called the Iberian Peoples Festival. It had an attendance of over 70,000. UAM has over a hundred student societies covering activities ranging from student unionism to theatre and music. The oldest active association in UAM is the Law Students Association (AED in Spanish), a left-leaning student union established in 1981. Furthermore, there are new prominent societies in the field of social sciences, such a Debate Society (Sociedad de Debates UAM) and a Model UN society (UAM-I-MUN), both founded and run mainly by law students.

UAM does not have a formal student government body, as it has been rejected by students in several occasions, and instead students elect different student unions (usually with difference on political issues) to the different university government bodies.

In recent years, UAM students have organised massively to protest against terrorism, after the assassination of Francisco Tomas y Valiente by ETA in 1995, against the Organic Law of Universities in 2001, to clean Spain's northern coast after the Prestige oil spill in 2002, against the War in Iraq in 2003, to assist to the II European Social Forum also in 2003, and in solidarity with the victims of the 11 March 2004 Madrid train bombings.

Festivals and parties
UAM is also a festive campus, holding several festivals during spring. The most important one was the Spring festival held until 1993, but halted due to massification. Since then minor festivals have been held by student associations. These festivals usually consist of rock concerts by amateur rock bands (many of which have members that are UAM) from midday until dusk. According to university regulations, festival profits have to be destined to charities or to the organisation of cultural events. In 2005, due to massification of the festivals that led to several problems, university officials suspended further festivals until a more convenient place for their celebration would be found. Thus, no festivals were held in 2006.

Notable alumni

Royalty
King Felipe VI of Spain, Law
Queen Sofia of Spain, studied Humanities, beginning her studies as Princess of Spain and finishing them as Queen of Spain.

Politics
 Diego López Garrido, Socialist parliamentary spokesman at the 8th legislature, PhD Law in 1981
 Gaspar Llamazares, Former United Left Party leader, Medicine (graduated at Oviedo University)
 Beatriz Corredor, Former Minister of Housing, Law in 1981
 Cristina Garmendia, Former Minister of Innovation and Science, PhD Biology in 1985
 Ángel Gabilondo, Former Minister of Education and Universities, Philosophy in 1980 (he also obtained his PhD taught at UAM and was rector of the university from 2002 to 2008)
 Trinidad Jiménez, Former Minister of Foreign Affairs, Law
 Cristobal Montoro, Former Minister of Finance, Economics 1973 (Also obtained his PhD and Taught at UAM)
 Rosalinda López Hernández, Mexican Senator, Master in Economic, Financial and Accounting Auditing
 Dolores Delgado, former Minister of Justice, Law
 Irene Montero, Minister of Equality, Psychology

Media
 Lorena Berdún, TV host and actress, Psychology
 Pepe Viyuela, Actor and clown, Philosophy
 Carlos Bardem, Actor and writer, History
 Macarena García, Actress, Psychology

Literature 

 Marcos Giralt Torrente, Philosophy
 Belén Gopegui, Law
 Rocío Orsi , Philosophy
 Alfonso Vallejo, Medicine

Business
 Borja Prado, Chairman of Endesa, Law

Science
 Jeannine Davis-Kimball (1929–2017), American archaeologist
 Cristina Nevado (1977 – now), Organometallic chemist
 Beatriz Rico, Neuroscientist

Noted faculty and researchers
 Severo Ochoa, Medicine Nobel laureate
 Margarita Salas, molecular biologist and member of the Royal Spanish Academy
 Francisco Tomás y Valiente, chief justice of the Constitutional Court of Spain (1986–1992), murdered by ETA
 Pedro Cruz Villalón, chief justice of the Constitutional Court of Spain (1998–2001)
 Enrique Tierno Galván, Mayor of Madrid (1986–1989)
 Antonio Remiro Brotóns, international lawyer and academic
 Aurelio Menéndez Menéndez, former Minister of Education and Science.
 Javier Solana, EU High Representative for the Common Foreign and Security Policy
 Nicolas Cabrera, physicist
 María Ángeles Durán (born 1942), sociologist and economist
 Federico Mayor Zaragoza, former UNESCO director general
 José Ignacio Wert, minister of Education, Culture and Sport
 Diego García-Borreguero, Director of the Sleep Research Institute in Madrid, Spain
 Antonio M. Echavarren, chemist who has contributed to recent advances in gold and palladium chemistry.
 Gabriella Morreale de Escobar, chemist and pioneering thyroid researcher

List of rectors 
Luis Sánchez Agesta (1970–1972)
Julio Rodríguez Martínez (1972–1973)
Gratiniano Nieto Gallo (1973–1978)
Pedro Martínez Montávez (1978–1982)
Julio González Campos (1982–1984)
Josefina Gómez Mendoza (1984–1985)
Cayetano López Martínez (1985–1994)
Raúl Villar Lázaro (1994–2002)
Ángel Gabilondo Pujol (2002–2009)
José María Sanz Martínez (2009–2017)
Rafael Garesse Alarcon (2017–2021)
Amaya Mendikoetxea (2021–present)

Gallery

See also
 List of universities in Spain
 List of forestry universities and colleges

References

External links

 Official site
 Official history

 
Universities in the Community of Madrid
Educational institutions established in 1968
Universities in Madrid
1968 establishments in Spain
Universities and colleges in Spain